Lotus maritimus is a species of plant in the legume family, native to Europe, Africa and temperate Asia. It is one of several species known as dragon's teeth.

References

Faboideae
Plants described in 1753
Taxa named by Carl Linnaeus